

Current listings

|}

Former listings

|}

Notes

References

 
Hood River County